Sivasagar district (Pron:  or ), formerly known as Sibsagar, is one of the 34 districts of Assam state in Northeast India. Sivasagar city is the administrative headquarters of this district. This historic place is also known for its rich biodiversity. The districts covers an area of 2668 square kilometers (of the total area of 78438 square kilometers of Assam). The district comprises two sub-divisions – Sivasagar and Nazira. The district of Sivasagar lies between 26.45°N and 27.15°N latitudes and 94.25°E and 95.25°E longitudes. The district is bounded by the Brahmaputra River to the north, Nagaland to the south, the Charaideo district to the east and the Jhanji River to the west. The Sivasagar district has acquired its distinct identity due to the co-existence of different races, tribes, languages and cultures.

History
The Sivasagar was established by Ahoms. Before the arrival of Ahoms, the area under the district was inhabited by the indigenous Tibeto-Burman tribes like Borahis and Morans.

Before the British period, the center of administration of Assam was around Sivasagar were the famous Ahoms ruled for nearly six hundred years. The Ahom kings took keen interest in building different temples, dedicated to various deities and which were usually flanked by large tanks which until today stand out as memorials to their glory in the district. Sivasagar, or Rangpur as it was known then, was the capital of the Ahom Kingdom from 1699 to 1788. The famous Joysagar Tank was excavated within 45 days by Rudra Singha (1696-1714) in memory of his mother Joymoti Konwari. The Joy Dol is situated on the bank of the Joysagar Tank. Pramatta Singha (1744-1751) built the Ranghar with bricks in 1745. Gaurisagar Tank is situated at a distance of about eight miles from Sivasagar town. The Sivasagar Tank was excavated by queen Ambika Devi in 1733. The Siva Dol, Vishnu Dol and Devi Dol are situated on the bank of the Sivasagar Tank. Rajeshwar Singha (1751-1769) built the Kareng Ghar in Gargaon. Charaideo, about 28 kilometers away from Sivasagar is famous for a cluster of Maidams, the Ahom age tumuli. Sukapha, the first Ahom king, constructed his capital at Charaideo in 1253. Sivasagar was earlier known as Rangpur and Rangpur was earlier known as Meteka. The original name of Sivasagar district was Sibpur. On February 24, 1826, the treaty of Yandaboo consolidated the British occupation of Assam. This treaty of Yandaboo brought an end to the roughly six hundred year long Ahom rule in Assam. After the 1826 treaty, the British government in Assam incorporated a number of administrative changes such as the formation of districts. The Sivasagar district was created after the annexation of Purandar Singha’s dominion of upper Assam in 1839. The Sadar headquarter of Sivasagar was transferred to Jorhat in 1912–13. The undivided old Sivasagar district comprised three subdivisions, namely Sivasagar, Jorhat and Golaghat. In 1983, the Sivasagar district was reorganized to carve out the Jorhat district. It was further divided on 15 August 1987 for the creation of the Golaghat district.

Geography
One of the quaintest towns of Eastern Assam, Sivasagar is one of the cleanest towns in Assam. The district is situated between 26.45° and 27.15° North latitudes and 94.25° and 95.25° East longitudes.

The Sivasagar district is bordered by the Naga Hills and Arunachal Pradesh in the south and south-east respectively and the Brahmaputra river  in the north. The district is mostly flat alluvial plain with hillocks on south-eastern and southern areas near the Nagaland border.

Economy
The main industries in Sivasagar are oil industry, tea industry & tourism industry. Majority of the population are agrarian.

Demographics
According to the 2011 census Sivasagar district has a population of 1,151,050, roughly equal to the population of East Timor. This gives it a ranking of 406th in India (out of a total of 640). Its population growth rate over the decade 2001-2011 was  9.37%.	Sivasagar	has a sex ratio of 	951	females for every 1000 males, and a literacy rate of 81.36%.

Hindus 927,706 (88.16%), Muslims 85,761 (8.15%).
The main communities living in the district are Ahoms, Chutia, Tea-tribes (Adivasi), Sonowal Kacharis, Mising, Indian Gorkhas and Deori.
There are also a few villages of Buddhist tribes like Khamyang and Turung people. Moreover, there is a small population of Tiwas, Konyak, Meitei and Nocte living in certain parts of the district.                 Many Rajasthani families are also present in Sivasagar district

Sibsagar is an overwhelming assamese majority district. According to the 2011 census, 84.26% of the district speaks Assamese, 4.98% Bengali, 7.32% Hindi, 1.86% Mikir as their first language and 1.58% speaks other languages.

Flora and fauna
There are also many reserve forests like Abhaypur, Dilli, Diroi, Geleky and Saleh. There are some unclassified forests along the Nagaland and Arunachal border. The vegetation is mostly tropical evergreen with trees like hollong, titachapa, nahor, mekai etc. dominating the canopy. 
The district is also rich in fauna. Various rare and endangered mammals like tiger, elephant, sun bear, sambar, hoolock gibbon are found in the reserve forests.

Festivals and fairs
The Bihus are the most popular agricultural festival in the district. The Bohag Bihu/Rongali Bihu marks the advent of the cropping season, the Magh Bihu is the harvest festival and the Kati Bihu held in the lean period of agriculture is marked by the observing of penance and prayer. The Vaishnav community observes the birth and death anniversaries of the prominent Vaishnava saints of the state. Tribal communities like the Mishings and Deoris also perform Bihu in their own styles. Id-ul-Zuha and Id-ul-fitr are religious festivals of the Muslim community. Other Hindu festivals observed in the district are Ambubashi, Durga Puja and Sivaratri . The Sivaratri Mela of Siva Dol in Sivasagar town has been observed since the days of Ahom rule. The Tea tribes maintain their own rich cultural traditions. The Jhumur dance and traditional music of these communities are very popular.

Sivasagar Day
The Sivasagar District celebrates Sivasagar Day on July the 1st of every year. The day is celebrated with cultural programs and cultural rallies along with plantation programmes in the entire Sivasagar District.

See also
 Matak Autonomous Council

References

External links
 District administration website

 
Districts of Assam
Ahom kingdom
1983 establishments in Assam